Jakob Bürgin was a Swiss footballer who played for FC Basel in their season 1927–28 as a defender.

In that season Bürgin played a total of five games for Basel. Two of these games were in the Swiss Serie A, one in the Swiss Cup and two were friendly games. He played his league debut on 4 September 1927 in the away match against FC Bern.

References

Books
 Rotblau: Jahrbuch Saison 2017/2018. Publisher: FC Basel Marketing AG. 
 Die ersten 125 Jahre. Publisher: Josef Zindel im Friedrich Reinhardt Verlag, Basel.

Internet

External links
 Verein "Basler Fussballarchiv" Homepage

FC Basel players
Swiss men's footballers
Association football defenders